Jawbone is an American band who primarily play hardcore punk. Their first EP, Loss of Innocence, was released in 2011 by Blood and Ink Records.

Background
Jawbone originated in Evansville, Indiana in 2009. The band's members are lead vocalist Clint Vaught, lead guitarist Aaron Travis, bassist Hieronymus Mitchell, and drummer Neil Engleman.

Music history
The band commenced as a musical entity in 2009, with their release, Loss of Innocence, an EP, which was released by Blood and Ink Records on June 7, 2011.

Members
Current
 Clint Vaught – vocals
 Aaron Travis – guitar (formerly of Torn)
 Hieronymus Mitchell – bass guitar
 Neil Engleman – drums (formerly of Torn)

Discography
EPs
 Loss of Innocence (June 7, 2011, Blood & Ink)

References

External links
Facebook page

Musical groups from Indiana
2009 establishments in Indiana
Musical groups established in 2009
Blood and Ink Records artists